Schwarzeck may refer to:

Places in Bavaria, Germany
 Schwarzeck (Ramsau), village in the municipality of Ramsau bei Berchtesgaden, Berchtesgadener Land
 Schwarzeck (Velden), village in the market borough of Velden, Landshut

Mountains
 Schwarzeck (Radstädter Tauern), 2,636 m, mountain in the Hochfeind Group in Salzburg, Austria
 Schwarzeck (Loferer Steinberge), 1,565 m, mountain in the ski area of Loferer Alm, Salzburg, Austria
 Schwarzeck (Totes Gebirge), 1,537 m, mountain in the ski area of Wurzeralm, Upper Austria
 Schwarzeck (Bavarian Forest), 1,238 m, mountain on the Arber ridge, Bavaria, Germany

See also
 Hochschwarzeck, a mountain and ski resort near Ramsau bei Berchtesgaden